Count Pyotr "Petya" Ilyich Rostov (1797–1812) is a character in Leo Tolstoy's 1869 novel War and Peace. The youngest member of the Rostov family, Petya is initially a minor character; however, towards the end of the novel, Petya's importance to the plot increases as he joins the Russian army in their defence against the French invasion of 1812. In the latter stages of the book Petya takes part in an attack on a French corps and is fatally wounded. This scene, along with the death of Prince Andrei Nikolaeitch Bolkonski is one of the most famous (and shocking) in classical Russian literature.

Reception
George R. Clay asserts that Tolstoy's "choice of fifteen-year old Petya Rostov as the one through whom to dramatize Moscow's response to the arrival of Emperor Alexander is masterful for the number of effects it accomplishes simultaneously".

See also
 List of characters in War and Peace

References

External links
"Petya Rostov (Character) from War and Peace (1956)," IMDb

Fictional counts and countesses
Fictional soldiers
Characters in War and Peace
Fictional Russian people in literature
Male characters in literature
Literary characters introduced in 1869